Carey Patrick Joyce (1 August 1922 – 24 October 2010) was an Irish Fianna Fáil politician. A farmer and agricultural contractor from Fermoy, Joyce was elected to Dáil Éireann as a Fianna Fáil Teachta Dála (TD) for the Cork East constituency at the 1981 general election. He lost his seat at the February 1982 general election. He was a member of Cork County Council for the Mallow area from 1974 to 1999.

References

 

1922 births
2010 deaths
Fianna Fáil TDs
Members of the 22nd Dáil
Local councillors in County Cork
Irish farmers